The following radio stations broadcast on AM frequency 1470 kHz: 1470 AM is a Regional broadcast frequency.

Argentina
 LT20 in Junin, Buenos Aires.
 LT26 in Colon, Entre Rios.
 LT28 in Rafaela, Santa Fe.
 LU26 in Coronel Dorrego, Buenos Aires.
 Cadena AM 1470 in Lanús, Buenos Aires.

Canada
 CJVB in Vancouver, British Columbia - 50 kW, transmitter located at

Mexico
 XEAI-AM in Mexico City
 XEACE-AM in Mazatlán, Sinaloa
 XEBAL-AM in Bécal, Campeche
 XEHI-AM in Ciudad Miguel Alemán, Tamaulipas
 XERCN-AM in Tijuana, Baja California

United States

References

Lists of radio stations by frequency